For the 1975 Vuelta a España, the field consisted of 90 riders; 54 finished the race.

By rider

By nationality

References

1975 Vuelta a España
1975